The UCW-Zero Tag Team Championship is the primary tag team title in Ultra Championship Wrestling-Zero. It was first won by Los Mochis (Paco and Pedro) in March 2003 and defended throughout the state of Utah, most often in Salt Lake City, but also in the Rocky Mountains and the Southwest United States. The title was formerly recognized by AWA Superstars from 2005 to 2007, and then by the National Wrestling Alliance when the promotion became an NWA territory that same year.

Title history

References

External links
UCW-Zero Tag Team Title at TitleHistories.com
 UCW-Zero Tag Team Title at Solie's Title Histories

Regional professional wrestling championships